Tuğba Melis Türk (born 7 September 1990) is a Turkish actress and model. She came first at the Best Model of Turkey contest in 2011.

Filmography

References

External links
 

Living people
1990 births
21st-century Turkish actresses
Turkish film actresses
Turkish female models
Survivor Turkey contestants

Actresses from Sofia
Bulgarian Turks in Turkey